This is a list of Black/African Americans who are also members of the lesbian, gay, bisexual, transgender, queer and/or intersex communities.

Historical figures

Government and politics

Entertainment and media

Other

References

Lists of African-American people
 
Lists of American LGBT people